Renata Ulmanski (: born 29 November 1929) is a Serbian actress. She appeared in more than ninety films since 1955. Ulmanski was married to Serbian politician and writer Mirko Tepavac (1922–2014).

Selected filmography

References

External links 

1929 births
Living people
Actresses from Zagreb
Serbian film actresses
Serbs of Croatia